Llulluchayoc (hispanicized spelling from Quechua Llulluch'ayuq, llulluch'a an edible gelatinous, dark green bacteria (nostocales), -yuq a suffix to indicate ownership, "the one with the llulluch'a") is a rural municipality and village in Jujuy Province in Argentina.

References

Populated places in Jujuy Province